College of Law of São Bernardo do Campo (in Portuguese: Faculdade de Direito de São Bernardo do Campo (FDSBC), also known as "Direito São Bernardo") is a public institution of higher education located in São Bernardo do Campo.

History

Created by the Municipal Law nº 1.246/1964, the Faculty of Law of São Bernardo do Campo was built in the district of Jardim do Mar, in São Bernardo do Campo. The admission exam, called vestibular, is the same of the Pontifical Catholic University of São Paulo.

References

External links
 Faculdade de Direito de São Bernardo do Campo - FDSBC
 Centro Acadêmico XX de Agosto
 FDSBC - Imagem de Satélite (Google Maps)

Universities and colleges in São Paulo (state)
Law schools in Brazil
State universities in Brazil